The 2010–11 Michigan State Spartans men's basketball team represented Michigan State University in the 2010–11 NCAA Division I men's basketball season. Tom Izzo led the Spartans in his 16th year at Michigan State. The team played their home games at the Breslin Center in East Lansing, Michigan, and competed in the Big Ten Conference. The Spartans finished the season 19–15, 9–9 in Big Ten play to finish in a tie for fourth place. The Spartans lost in the semifinals of the Big Ten tournament and received an at-large bid to the NCAA tournament, their 14th consecutive appearance. As a No. 10 seed, they lost in the round of 64 to UCLA.

Previous season 
The Spartans finished the 2009–10 season 28–9, 14–4 in Big Ten play to finish in a three-way tie for the regular season championship. MSU lost in the quarterfinals of the Big Ten tournament to Minnesota. Michigan State received a No. 5 seed in the NCAA tournament, their 13th straight trip to the Tournament. There, they defeated New Mexico State, Maryland, Northern Iowa, and Tennessee to advance to the Final Four, their sixth overall trip and second consecutive trip under Tom Izzo. In the Final Four, they lost to Butler.

Offseason 
The Spartans lost Raymar Morgan (11.3 points and 6.2 rebounds per game) to graduation following the season. Chris Allen was also dismissed from the team following the season.

2010 Recruiting class

Season summary 
The Spartans were led by seniors, Kalin Lucas (17.0 points and 3.4 assists per game) and Durrell Summers (11.6 points and 4.2 rebounds per game), and junior Draymond Green (12.6 points, 8.6 rebounds, and 4.1 assists per game). On the strength of their trip to the Final Four the previous year, the team began the season ranked No. 2 in the country. The Spartans made their second trip under Izzo to the Maui Invitational and were upset again, this time by UConn. In the third place game, Michigan State defeated No. 13 Washington. MSU suffered further losses to No. 1 Duke in the ACC-Big Ten Challenge, No. 8 Syracuse in the Jimmy V Classic, and No. 18 Texas. They finished the non-conference portion of their season 8–4 and ranked No. 20 in the country.

On January 26, 2011, backup point guard Korie Lucious, who averaged 6.5 points and 4.1 assists per game for the Spartans, was dismissed from the team.

The Spartans were inconsistent in conference play, beating No. 14 Minnesota and No. 20 Wisconsin, but suffering nine losses in conference and finishing the regular season with a 17–13 overall record and 9–9 in conference and in danger of missing the NCAA Tournament. After beating Iowa and blowing out No. 9 Purdue in the Big Ten tournament, the Spartans fell to Penn State in the semifinals. The blowout win over Purdue likely ensured the Spartans inclusion in the NCAA Tournament.

Michigan State received a No. 10 seed in the Southeast Region of the NCAA tournament, their 14th straight appearance, but the lowest seeding the Spartans had received in the NCAA Tournament since 2002. The Spartans faced No. 7-seeded UCLA in the Second Round (formerly known as the First Round). They trailed by as many as 23 points in the first half and trailed by 42–24 at the half. In the second half, MSU began to foul on nearly every possession in the second half and closed the lead, outscoring UCLA 52–36 in the half. However, the rally fell short and they lost 78–76.

Roster

Schedule and results

|-
!colspan=9 style=| Exhibition

|-
!colspan=9 style=| Non-conference regular season

|-
!colspan=9 style=|Big Ten regular season

|-
!colspan=9 style=|Big Ten tournament

|- 
!colspan=9 style=|NCAA tournament

Player statistics 

Source

Rankings

Awards and honors 
 Kalin Lucas – All Big Ten Second Team
 Kalin Lucas – USBWA All-District Team
 Draymond Green – All Big Ten Third Team

References

Michigan State Spartans men's basketball seasons
Michigan State
Michigan State
2010 in sports in Michigan
2011 in sports in Michigan